, often abbreviated as Senzaishū, is an imperial anthology of Japanese waka poetry. It was compiled in 1187 by Fujiwara no Shunzei at the behest of the Retired Emperor Go-Shirakawa, who ordered it in 1183. It consists of twenty volumes containing 1,285 poems.

References
pg. 484 of Japanese Court Poetry, Earl Miner, Robert H. Brower. 1961, Stanford University Press, LCCN 61-10925

12th-century Japanese books
Japanese poetry anthologies
Late Old Japanese texts
Heian period in literature
Early Middle Japanese texts
1180s in Japan
Buddhist poetry